The Journal of Medicine was a medical journal that was published by Karger Publishers from 1970 to 2004. It continued the journal Medicina experimentalis that was published from 1959 to 1969.

Karger academic journals
General medical journals
Publications established in 1970
Bimonthly journals
Publications established in 1959
Publications disestablished in 1969
Publications disestablished in 2004
English-language journals